Micah Johnson (born June 22, 1988) is a professional Canadian football defensive tackle for the Saskatchewan Roughriders of the Canadian Football League (CFL).  He was originally signed by the New York Giants as an undrafted free agent in 2010. He played college football for the Kentucky Wildcats. He has also spent time with the Miami Dolphins, Kansas City Chiefs, Cincinnati Bengals, Green Bay Packers, Calgary Stampeders, BC Lions, and Hamilton Tiger-Cats.

Early years
While playing linebacker and running back for Fort Campbell High School, Johnson was selected as the 2005 Kentucky Mr. Football. Having played only two years at Ft. Campbell, his career totals there included 2,543 rushing yards, 46 touchdowns, and 293 tackles. Johnson played his freshman and sophomore years at West Potomac High School in Alexandria, Virginia, where he also starred in basketball. A highly regarded recruit, Johnson chose the University of Kentucky over Georgia and Notre Dame. Following his high school career, Johnson was invited to play in the 2006 U.S. Army All-American Bowl.

Rated the nation's top inside linebacker by ESPN, he was also selected as a high school All-American by Parade, EA Sports, PrepStar and SuperPrep. Considered a four-star recruit by Rivals.com, Johnson was listed as the No. 2 strongside defensive end prospect in the nation in 2006.

College career
Johnson recorded 29 tackles (20 solo, 9 assist) at linebacker in his freshman season for the Kentucky Wildcats. He was voted to the All-SEC Freshman Team by the coaches of the conference. In the Wildcats' 2006 Music City Bowl victory against Clemson University, Johnson entered the game as a running back and scored a touchdown.

As a sophomore, he recorded 58 tackles, 2 interceptions, and 5 pass breakups.

As a junior, he recorded 57 solo tackles, 30 assisted, 11.5 for loss, and 2.5 sacks. Johnson earned first-team All-SEC honors, and he considered early entry into the 2009 NFL Draft. However, Johnson opted to stay for his senior year.

Professional career

New York Giants
Johnson was signed by the New York Giants as an undrafted free agent following the 2010 NFL Draft. He was waived on June 21, 2010.

Miami Dolphins
On August 3, 2010, Johnson was signed by the Miami Dolphins. He was waived on September 15, 2010.

Kansas City Chiefs
On December 8, 2010, Johnson was signed to the practice squad by the Kansas City Chiefs. He played in one regular season game in 2010. He was waived on September 3, 2011.

Cincinnati Bengals
On December 13, 2011, Johnson was signed by the Cincinnati Bengals to the practice squad.

Calgary Stampeders
On May 27, Johnson was signed by the Calgary Stampeders of the Canadian Football League. Johnson worked his way up the ranks with Calgary over the years, winning the Grey Cup in 2014 as a backup. Subsequent years saw Johnson working his way into a starting role, while returning to the championship game for the 2016 and 2017 seasons, where Calgary suffered a pair of heartbreaking losses to Ottawa and Toronto. In 2018, Johnson and the Stamps won the 106th Grey Cup, and Johnson's efforts resulted in his recognition as one of the most dominant interior rushers in the game, with 14 sacks, 3 forced fumbles, and an interception. He was named to his 3rd consecutive CFL-West All Star team.

In 81 career games during his 6 seasons in Calgary, Johnson has amassed 158 tackles, 2 tackles on special teams, 41 sacks, 2 interceptions, and 6 forced fumbles.

Saskatchewan Roughriders
On February 12, 2019, Johnson signed a one-year contract with the Saskatchewan Roughriders for $250,000 CAD, making him one of the highest paid defensive players in the CFL. Johnson missed a few games with injury, and had a slow start to the year while adjusting to the new team and defensive scheme; Johnson did not record his first sack until week 13 during the 2019 edition of the Banjo Bowl. However, it was the beginning of a critical stretch of games for the Riders in which Johnson had three consecutive games with a sack, with four in five games. Johnson's 26 tackles and four sacks on the year helped the Riders finish with the best record in the West Division.

BC Lions
Upon entering free agency, Johnson signed a one-year contract with the BC Lions on February 11, 2020. However, the 2020 CFL season was cancelled and he never played for the Lions.

Saskatchewan Roughriders (II)
On the first day of free agency in 2021, Johnson re-signed with the Saskatchewan Roughriders on February 9, 2021.

Hamilton Tiger-Cats
On February 9, 2022, Johnson officially signed with the Hamilton Tiger-Cats.

Saskatchewan Roughriders (III)
On February 14, 2023, it was announced that Johnson had re-signed with the Saskatchewan Roughriders.

References

External links
 Saskatchewan Roughriders profile

1988 births
Living people
American football linebackers
Canadian football linebackers
American players of Canadian football
BC Lions players
Calgary Stampeders players
Saskatchewan Roughriders players
Kentucky Wildcats football players
Miami Dolphins players
New York Giants players
Players of American football from Columbus, Georgia
Sportspeople from Columbus, Georgia